Lasjia claudiensis is a species of tree in the protea family that is endemic to the Cape York Peninsula of Far North Queensland in north-eastern Australia. It is listed as Vulnerable under Queensland's Nature Conservation Act 1992 as well as Australia's Environment Protection and Biodiversity Conservation Act 1999.

History
The tree was first described in 1993 in the journal Australian Systematic Botany by Caroline Gross and Bernard Hyland as a species of Macadamia, but was transferred in 2008 in the American Journal of Botany by Peter Weston and Austin Mast to the new genus Lasjia, of which it is the type species.

Description
The thick, leathery leaves are 11.5–26 cm long by 4–13.5 cm wide. The terminal buds and young shoots are covered in rust-brown coloured hairs. The flowers grow as inflorescences with curved bracts. The globular fruits are 5–7 cm in diameter.

Distribution and habitat
The species occurs in monsoon forest and gallery forest on the Cape York Peninsula from near sea level to an altitude of 100 m.

References

claudiensis
Flora of Queensland
Endemic flora of Australia
Proteales of Australia
Taxa named by Bernard Hyland
Plants described in 1993
Vulnerable flora of Australia